The Pattullo Range is a subrange of the Hazelton Mountains, located south of Tesla Lake and northeast of Bella Coola in northern British Columbia, Canada.  Its highest summit is Tsaydaychuz Peak,  2758 m (9049 feet).

Name origin
The range was named for the Honourable Thomas Dufferin Pattullo, 22nd Premier of British Columbia, commemorating the Governor General's visit to Tweedsmuir Provincial Park in 1937, as invited by Mr Pattullo.

References
Pattullo Range in the Bivouac Mountain Encyclopedia

Hazelton Mountains